The Italian Socialist Party was an Italian political party founded 1892.

Italian Socialist Party may also refer to:

 New Italian Socialist Party
 Italian Socialist Party (2007)
 Socialist Party (Italy, 1996) 
 Italian Revolutionary Socialist Party
 Italian Reformist Socialist Party
 Unitary Socialist Party (Italy, 1922)
 Unitary Socialist Party (Italy, 1949)
 Italian Democratic Socialist Party
 Italian Socialist Party of Proletarian Unity
 The Italian Socialists
 United Socialists (Italy)

See also
 Italian Communist Party